is a music video game published and developed by Nintendo for the Nintendo DS handheld game console. It was released in Japan on December 2, 2004 as a launch game for the Nintendo DS. The game features multiple songs, which include classical music, television themes, and video game music. The game is controlled using both the buttons on the DS as well as its touch screen in certain portions. It uses a variety of different instruments, which are combined selectively in order to compose a song. Besides the primary mode, players may play together, each one playing a different instrument in the song. Players may also compose their own songs. It was to be released in the United States as Jam with the Band, but was never released nor formally cancelled. It has a sequel titled Jam with the Band, which was released in Japan in 2008 and in Europe in  2010.

Gameplay 
The single-player game of Band Brothers includes 35 normal songs, plus three unlockable songs. These are divided into the categories J-Pop, World, TV (anime/tokusatsu), Classic, and Game (includes a variety of medleys from Nintendo titles such as Mario, Fire Emblem, and Zelda). Each song has a number of parts available for the player to play, usually ranging from 6 to 8, and each part will generally be a different instrument, but many songs have more than one part played by the same instrument.

In the Beginner mode, all notes are represented either by a D-Pad icon or a button icon, and any direction or face button respectively will automatically play the correct note. In Amateur mode, each of the eight buttons on the face of the Nintendo DS system correspond to a musical note; there is also a drum set where each button, including the L and R buttons, plays a specific drum or cymbal. As many songs contain fast or difficult parts to play, they are covered in the Beginner and Amateur modes—when the cursor is about to move over them, the lower screen will change to the "touch" command; touching the bottom screen at this time causes the notes underneath the touch screen portion to be played automatically. These do not contribute to the player's score, but prevent high-speed sequences from being forced on the player early on, and activating them helps to keep the rhythm and flow of the song.

In Pro Mode, the player must hold down the L button while playing specified notes to change them to a sharp, and hold down the R button at other notes to raise them one octave; some notes combine both of these functions to raise a sharp note an octave. In addition, the drum set sometimes requires the player to hit two notes at once, and the touch screen portions must be played manually; at this point the game receives a drastic increase in difficulty, and essentially turns the Nintendo DS into a musical instrument.

As a song progresses, the top screen scrolls through one bar at a time (one stretching across the screen horizontally, and the next few bars shown below it). A cursor moves to show where in the song the player currently is, and as the cursor moves over a note's "head", the aim is to press the button displayed on that head, and if necessary holding it down until the end of the "tail". Some long notes will have a tail extending across multiple bars, and very short ones will have none at all. Successfully hit the buttons at the proper time and it'll make an excellent piece of music, but hit it at the wrong time and it'll sound like a jumbled mess.

As in many music/rhythm-based games, every single note is given a title based on the accuracy, and the more accurate notes increase the score by more.  These ranks are Best (perfect timing), Good (slightly too fast or slow), Bad (the note's head will not disappear; much too fast or slow) and Miss (the correct note was not played at all, or stopped before the end of the tail). At the end of a song, the score is calculated as a number out of 100.

In Free Play Mode the player scrolls through the songs using up and down on the D-Pad, and selects a part from the list using the touch screen. Listed with the instrument name will be a star difficulty level from 1 to 5. In Amateur and Pro modes (which are judged separately and toggled via a switch on the title screen), the player's score is recorded and appears next to the instrument of the song.

Progression through the game is done in the Recording Ticket mode, a single player mode where the player must play three randomly selected songs, depending on the ticket level of the player; for example a level three ticket will have the player randomly playing songs using instruments with a 3-star difficulty rating. The goal is to play the three songs and get a total score of 240/300, while making as few mistakes as possible; if the player makes too many mistakes, represented by a bomb and a burning fuse, then the game ends.

Beating the Recording Ticket Mode at the Beginner level, which only has 1 level, unlocks the Amateur mode; and beating all five levels of Amateur mode unlocks Professional mode. Beating the five levels of the Professional mode unlocks the Recording Ticket Gold Mode, a harder version of Professional Recording Ticket Mode that requires a near perfect performance to beat, i.e. 297/300; Recording Ticket Gold Mode consists of only one level, with songs randomly chosen from all 5 difficulty levels.

Daigasso! Band Brothers utilizes the Nintendo DS' Wireless Link connection to allow multiple players to join in and make music. In 2 to 8 player link-ups, each player, like in solo player mode, takes command of one specific instrument in the music piece. Each player in the group is part of a band, and must play the song together as a group, and the better each player follows along, the more in tune the song comes through. Every note played, right or wrong, can be heard on the other players' systems, and if every single part in the song is played by a human absolutely nothing will be automated. Scores are measured by percentage of notes hit, each players percentage is represented by a balloon in the bottom screen. This lets everyone know how they are doing in comparison to their friends score.

Another feature is a full blown music editor allowing the player to create their own custom tunes, using the touch screen to select the notes. It contains the basic features of any MIDI composer, although you are limited to 8 parts in a song and not every single MIDI instrument is available. This mode is used by many people to recreate tunes from video games or other MIDIs using a program to convert them into sheet music.
There is also a mode in which players can sing or hum a tune into the Nintendo DS microphone, which will be recognized by the game and converted into notes on the screen. Any musical piece the player compose can be transmitted wirelessly to a friend's cart(s) so they can play the song.

Song list

Development 
The game first appeared at the Tokyo Game Show in the Spring of 2001 where it was announced for the Game Boy Advance—although it was originally being developed for the Game Boy Color—under the tentative name Game Boy Music. It lacked many of the features in the DS game, such as the touch screen and wireless multiplayer, but it had a wide variety of instruments to play, and featured the same graphical style of the DS game; it also starred the game's mascot, who would eventually be named Barbara the Bat.
The game was delayed for several reasons, but the two main reasons were:
 The limited technology of the Game Boy systems made it difficult to produce a good music game; in particular, the lack of buttons and an inadequate sound system.
 The developers of the game had trouble getting Nintendo to approve the new characters they created, as a new character would not have the automatic appeal of an existing character.

Eventually, Daigasso! Band Brothers was released in Japan for the Nintendo DS in 2004 as a launch title; the game was also announced for a North American release, and as late as September 2006, it was listed as "in development", but it is no longer found on Nintendo of America's website.  It was also listed as "To Be Confirmed" on Nintendo Australia's website until its last relaunch.

On September 26, 2005, Nintendo released an expansion pack titled Daigasso! Band Brothers Tsuika Kyoku Cartridge (or Great Concert! Band Brothers Request Selection Cartridge in English). The expansion comes in the form of a GBA cartridge, which is inserted into the DS at the same time as the original Band Brothers card, making Band Brothers the first DS game that uses the GBA port for more than some minor unlockables. It features 31 new songs, which were chosen based on a survey posted on Nintendo's website in July 2005. The scores of the songs do not save after being played.

Sequel 
On June 26, 2008, a sequel named Daigasso! Band Brothers DX was released for the Nintendo DS in Japan. It was released in Europe under the name Jam with the Band on May 21, 2010. The sequel is capable of interacting with the Wii through a game-specific channel called the Live Channel, known as the Speaker Channel in Japan. Jam with the Band also allows the player to download new songs to the 8 megabyte capacity game cartridge via Nintendo Wi-Fi Connection.

Daigasso! Band Brothers P 
On November 14, 2013, another sequel named Daigasso! Band Brothers P was released for the Nintendo 3DS in Japan. It was developed by Intelligent Systems. On May 1, 2020, Daigasso! Band Brothers P was discontinued and became unplayable.

Notes

References

External links 
Official webpage 

2004 video games
Cancelled Game Boy Advance games
Cancelled Game Boy Color games
Music video games
Nintendo franchises
Nintendo DS games
Nintendo DS-only games
Nintendo games
Nintendo Research & Development 2 games
Turntable video games
Multiplayer and single-player video games
Video games developed in Japan
Video games scored by Akito Nakatsuka